Conflent is a historical Catalan comarca of Northern Catalonia, now part of the French  department of Pyrénées-Orientales. In the Middle Ages it comprised the County of Conflent. 

The capital of this pays is Prades, and it borders the pays of Capcir, Rosselló, Vallespir, Alta Cerdanya and Ripollès, and the Occitan-speaking pays of Fenolleda.
It roughly corresponds to the valley of the Têt River and its neighbourhoods between Rodès and Mont-Louis. Conflent is dominated by the Canigou mountain.

See also 
 Treaty of the Pyrenees
 Yellow Train

External links 

 Conflent in Catalan Encyclopaedia.

Geography of Pyrénées-Orientales